William Breton may refer to:

William Briton (died 1356), aka William Breton
William the Breton (c. 1165–c. 1225), French chronicler and poet
Sir William Breton (MP), Keeper of the Privy Purse (1763–1773) for George II

See also
William Bretton (1909–1971), Dean of Nelson
William Britain (disambiguation)
William Britton (disambiguation)